The 2012 WAFF Women's Futsal Championship was the second women's futsal championship for the West Asian Football Federation. The tournament was played in Bahrain. The draw took place on 2 April 2012 in Manama. Iran won the tournament for the second time.

Group stage

Group A

Group B

Knockout stage

Semi-finals

3rd-place match

Final

Awards 

 Most Valuable Player
 Top Scorer
 Deena Abdelrahman (11 goals)
 Fair-Play Award

References

External links
2012 WAFF Women's Futsal Championship results

2012 in Asian football
2012 in Asian futsal
2012
2012
2011–12 in Bahraini football
2011–12 in Iraqi football
2011–12 in Iranian futsal
2011–12 in Jordanian football
2011–12 in Qatari football
2011–12 in Lebanese football
2011–12 in Palestinian football